The 2004 season was the San Francisco 49ers' 55th in the National Football League, the 59th overall and their second and final under head coach Dennis Erickson, as he was fired after the season.

The 49ers attempted to improve on their 7–9 output from the previous season, but the 49ers finished the season at 2–14, both wins coming against division-rival Arizona Cardinals in overtime by the same score. The 49ers earned the #1 overall pick in the 2005 NFL Draft, where they selected quarterback Alex Smith, who would play for the team for eight seasons.

The season marked changes for the 49ers, who lost three key members of the 2001 team. Quarterback Jeff Garcia was released in the off-season and later signed with the Cleveland Browns, running back Garrison Hearst went to the Denver Broncos, and controversial wide receiver Terrell Owens went to the Philadelphia Eagles, where they lost to the New England Patriots in the Super Bowl.

Offseason

NFL draft

Roster

Schedules

Preseason

Regular season

Game Summaries

Week 1: vs. Atlanta Falcons

The 49ers opened the season at home against the Falcons. The game was statistically dominated by the 49ers, but they were required to make a fourth quarter comeback. The 49ers had an opportunity to tie the game, but a two-point conversion pass attempt from Tim Rattay fell harmlessly to the ground. The loss had the 49ers open the season at 0–1.

Week 2: at New Orleans Saints

In a high-scoring battle, in which both teams scored during all four quarters, the Saints bested the 49ers by a three-point differential. The 49ers took an early lead with a 30-yard field goal by Todd Peterson, but after the Saints scored, the 49ers played catch-up the rest of the game. With this close loss, the 49ers dropped to 0–2 on the season.

Week 3: at Seattle Seahawks

The 49ers suffered a 34–0 loss to the Seattle Seahawks in week 3. It was the first shutout of a 49ers team since the Atlanta Falcons handed them a 7–0 loss in week 4 of the 1977 season (they were also shut out in week 1 that season by the Pittsburgh Steelers). This remains the longest such streak in the NFL. While the Seahawks scored several field goals and touchdowns, the 49ers could only manage nine first downs and turned the ball over four times (two interceptions and two lost fumbles). With the loss, the 49ers fell to 0–3.

Week 4: vs. St. Louis Rams

Again the 49ers struggled, not putting any points on the board until the fourth quarter. Despite Tim Rattay throwing for 299 yards and the team gaining more first downs than the Rams, St. Louis' defense held fast, preventing the 49ers from scoring until the fourth quarter. The loss meant the 49ers started the season at 0–4.

Week 5: vs. Arizona Cardinals

The 49ers finally won their first game of the season in Week 5 against the Arizona Cardinals. After a scoreless first quarter, the Cardinals took a 16-point lead 28–12. In the fourth quarter, the 49ers scored 16 unanswered points (two touchdowns with two accompanying two-point conversions) to tie the game as regulation ended. In the overtime period, the 49ers' kicker Todd Peterson sent a 32-yard kick through the uprights, giving the 49ers their first victory of the season. Now in the win column, the 49ers were 1–4.

Week 6: at New York Jets

It seemed the 49ers would obtain their second straight victory when they secured a 14-point lead before halftime. However, the 49ers' defense fell apart after the half and the Jets scored 22 unanswered points and forced two turnovers to secure the win. With the 49ers' loss, they fell to 1–5 heading into their bye week.

Week 8: at Chicago Bears

Coming out of their bye, the 49ers took an early lead, this time 10–7, however, they were shut out in the second half. Despite three turnovers, the Bears came away with the victory. Between the two teams, five field goals were scored, including two from longer than 50 yards. The loss dropped the 49ers to 1–6 on the season.

Week 9: vs. Seattle Seahawks

In another high-scoring affair, the Seahawks clinched a season sweep over the 49ers using their high-powered offense. The game was back-and-forth until the Seahawks a lead at 28–24 that they would not relinquish, beating the 49ers in nearly every statistically category. Their third straight loss dropped the 49ers to 1–7.

Week 10: vs. Carolina Panthers

It appeared the 49ers would snap their three-game losing streak when they took at 17–0 lead, however, the Panthers were able to slowly creep back into the game. Several field goals and touchdowns later, the game was tied at 27 and the Panthers scored a final field goal to come away with the win, 30–27. The loss dropped the 49ers to 1–8 and completed their second four-game losing streak of the season.

Week 11: at Tampa Bay Buccaneers

The 49ers didn't have a chance in this lopsided game, falling to the Buccaneers 35–3. With an output of only 197 total yards, the 49ers' lone field goal came off the foot of kicker Todd Peterson from 47 yards out. Their fifth consecutive loss brought the 49ers down to 1–9.

Week 12: vs. Miami Dolphins

Looking to snap their five-game losing streak, the 49ers were, statistically, the better team, but three turnovers doomed their chances. The 49ers led at one point, 10–7, but the Dolphins regained the lead in the fourth quarter and the 49ers came away with another loss, 24–17. This loss was their sixth in succession and tenth of the season.

Week 13: at St. Louis Rams

In a low-scoring contest, the 49ers lost to the division rival Rams by a score of 16–6. The 49ers were limited to only nine first downs in the game and could only manage two field goals, one of which was from 51 yards. This game marked the 49ers' seventh consecutive loss as they fell to 1–11 and they were swept by the Rams for the first time since 2001.

Week 14: at Arizona Cardinals

In an overtime game, the 49ers managed to snap their seven-game losing streak by outdueling the Arizona Cardinals, 31–28. The 49ers seemingly had this game already wrapped up when they took a twenty-one point lead, but the Cardinals fought back and scored 18 points in the fourth quarter to force overtime. A 31-yard field goal by Todd Peterson sealed the victory for the 49ers. Breaking their seven-game losing streak, the 49ers improved to 2–11. At this point of the season, the 49ers were 2–0 against the Cardinals and 0–11 against the rest of the league.

Week 15: vs. Washington Redskins

The 49ers failed in their attempt to string together two victories, losing this contest 26–16 to the Redskins. The 49ers never led, but they did score a rare safety in the second quarter. Statistically, it was a close game, both teams posting similar yardage and first downs, however, four interceptions by 49ers quarterback Ken Dorsey sealed the loss and dropped the team to 2–12.

Week 16: vs. Buffalo Bills

In a blowout, the Bills dominated the 49ers 41–7. While the Bills managed to score in the double-digits in three of the four-quarters, the 49ers only managed a single touchdown in the final minutes of the game. This was the second consecutive game in which the 49ers had four turnovers (this time three interceptions and one fumble) and the Bills were able to roll up over twice as many total yards as the 49ers. With the loss, the 49ers fell to 2–13 going into the final game of the season.

Week 17: at New England Patriots

Hoping to end their miserable season with a win, the 49ers flew to Gillette Stadium to play a Patriots team that was looking for the second seed in the AFC playoffs. In a game in which one touchdown was scored each quarter, the 49ers lost to the New England Patriots 21–7. The 49ers struck first, but the Patriots defense held them to that single touchdown. Both teams were riddled with mistakes, both turnovers and penalties; however, the Patriots were able to capitalize on the 49ers' errors.

The 49ers closed their season at 2–14 on a three-game losing streak, giving the team the first overall pick in the 2005 draft.

Standings

Notes

References

San Francisco 49ers seasons
San Francisco 49ers
San Francisco 49ers season
San Francisco 49ers season